Bertil Knut Hilding Linde (28 February 1907 – 25 March 1990) was a Swedish ice hockey player who won a silver medal at the 1928 Winter Olympics.

Linde competed in ice hockey, bandy and football, but never won a national title. After retiring from competitions he worked as a machinist at Arenco AB, a leading manufacturer of packaging and fish processing machinery.

References

External links
 

1907 births
1990 deaths
AIK IF players
Ice hockey players at the 1928 Winter Olympics
Medalists at the 1928 Winter Olympics
Olympic ice hockey players of Sweden
Olympic medalists in ice hockey
Olympic silver medalists for Sweden
Swedish ice hockey players
Ice hockey people from Stockholm